"Mary Had a Little Lamb" is a nursery rhyme.

Mary Had a Little Lamb may also refer to:
"Mary Had a Little Lamb" (Wings song) (1972)
"Mary Had a Little Lamb", a 1968 song by Buddy Guy from A Man and the Blues
"Mary Had a Little Lamb", a 2001 song by Garth Brooks from Songs from Call Me Claus
 Mary Had a Little Lamb, a painting by Edith Susan Gerard Anderson
"Mary Had a Little Lamb", an episode of Teletubbies

See also
Mary Had a Little..., a 1962 British comedy film
Marykkundoru Kunjaadu (Mary Had a Little Lamb), a 2010 Malayalam film